Terminal end buds (TEBs) are highly proliferative structures at the ends of elongating lactiferous ducts which are involved in development of the mammary glands. TEBs are responsible for the formation of the mammary ductal tree during female puberty.

See also
 Breast development

References

Breast anatomy
Human female endocrine system